Olyra longicaudata is a species of longtail catfish native to India where it occurs in Darjelling Himalaya in Assam, and Myanmar, where it occurs in Tenassarim.

References

Bagridae
Fish of India
Fish of Myanmar
Taxa named by John McClelland (doctor)
Fish described in 1842